Carlos Antônio da Rocha Paranhos was the Ambassador Extraordinary and Plenipotentiary of the Federative Republic of Brazil to the Russian Federation from 2008 to 2013 and currently the Ambassador of the Federative Republic of Brazil to Myanmar, since 2020.

See also
Ambassadors of Brazil
Brazil–Russia relations
Foreign relations of Brazil

References

Ambassadors of Brazil to Denmark
Ambassadors of Brazil to Russia
Brazilian diplomats
Place of birth missing (living people)
Year of birth missing (living people)
Living people